The 1944 Richmond Spiders football team was an American football team that represented the University of Richmond as a member of the Southern Conference (SoCon) during the 1944 college football season. In their second season under head coach Malcolm Pitt, Richmond compiled a 2–6 record, with a mark of 0–4 in conference play, finishing in tenth place in the SoCon.

Schedule

References

Richmond
Richmond Spiders football seasons
Richmond Spiders football